Johann Christoph Bach may refer to:

Johann Christoph Bach (1642–1703), composer, Johann Sebastian Bach's first cousin once removed
Johann Christoph Bach (musician at Arnstadt) (1645–1693), musician,  J.S. Bach's uncle
Johann Christoph Bach (organist at Ohrdruf) (1671–1721), J.S. Bach's eldest brother
Johann Christoph Friedrich Bach (1732–1795), composer, son of J.S. Bach